Four ships of United States Navy have been named Bailey for Theodorus Bailey:

 , was a United States Coast Survey schooner in the early years of the American Civil War.
 , was a torpedo boat commissioned in 1901. She was renamed Coast Torpedo Boat No. 8 in 1918 and decommissioned in 1919.
 , was a Clemson-class destroyer, commissioned in 1919 and transferred to the Royal Navy in 1940, where she served as HMS Reading.
 , was a Benson-class destroyer, commissioned in 1942 and decommissioned in 1946.

Sources
 
 

United States Navy ship names